Najbolje pesme vol. 2 1992–1999 is the second greatest hits compilation by the Serbian rock band Električni Orgazam spanning the releases from 1992 until 1999.

Trackisting 
All tracks by S. Gojković except where noted.

 "Seks, droga, nasilje i strah" (5:15)
 "Sad ti je teško" (2:33)
 "Mentalno" (3:43)
 "Ša la la" (5:15)
 "Zašto da ne" (S. Gojković, B. Petrović) (4:12)
 "Ovaj put je tvoj" (S. Gojković, B. Petrović)  (3:02)
 "Spojimo se sad" (4:52)
 "Moj život je paranoja" (2:27)
 "Da si tako jaka" (S. Gojković, B. Petrović) (4:57)
 "Metadonska terapija" (2:58)
 "Poljubi me i priznaj mi" (3:56)
 "Sve ste vi naše devojke" (3:43)
 "Sunce zna da mesec zna" (2:55)
 "Ti" (4:43)
 "Ona uvek želi sve" (4:22)
 "I nikog nema da nas probudi" (3:03)
 "Gde da nađem sada ja sebi takvu devojku?" (2:27)
 "Reči lete baš bez veze" (3:41)
 "Kakav je to svet?" (3:46)
 "Više nikad kao nekad" (4:42)

Notes 
 Tracks 1 to 5 - from Seks, droga, nasilje i strah / Balkan Horror Rock (1992)
 Tracks 6 to 10 - from Zašto da ne! (1994)
 Tracks 11 to 15 - from Živo i akustično (1996)
 Tracks 16 to 20 - from A um bum (1999)

References 
 Discography page at the official site
 Najbolje pesme vol. 2 1992-1999 at Discogs

2002 compilation albums
PGP-RTS compilation albums
Električni Orgazam compilation albums